Intimités is the second EP by Miss Kittin & The Hacker. An electroclash record, it was released in 1999 on International DeeJay Gigolo Records.

Track listing

Source:

References

1999 EPs
Miss Kittin albums
The Hacker albums